Claudie Cuvelier (married name is Schisano) (born 13 May   1943 at Wignehies) is a former French athlete, who specialised in the shot put and the discus throw.

Biography  
She won three champion of France titles  in the shot put (1966, 1967 and 1969) and three  champion of France titles in the discus throw (1967, 1968 and 1969)..

She three times improved the French shot put record (14.58m,  15.11m and 15.31m in 1967) and also she bettered the record three times in the discus  (48.54m, 49.70m in 1967, and 50.82m in 1969)

Prize list  
 French Championships in Athletics   :  
 3 times winner of the shot put in 1966,  1967 and 1969   
 3 times winner of the discus in 1967,  1968 and 1969.

Records

References  
  Docathlé2003, French Athletics Federation, 2003 p. 397

1943 births
French female discus throwers
French female shot putters
Living people
Sportspeople from Nord (French department)